The 1993 Troy State Trojans football team represented Troy State University—now known as Troy University—as an independent during the 1993 NCAA Division I-AA football season. Led by third-year head coach Larry Blakeney, the Trojans compiled a record of 12–1–1. Troy State finished the regular season with a 10–0–1 record and a No. 1 ranking in the final Sports Network poll. The Trojans advanced to the NCAA Division I-AA Football Championship playoffs, beating  in the first round and McNeese State in the quarterfinals, before losing to Marshall in the semifinals by a score of 24–21. The team played home games at Veterans Memorial Stadium in Troy, Alabama.

Schedule

References

Troy State
Troy Trojans football seasons
Troy State Trojans football